Enric Morera i Viura (22 May 1865 – 11 March 1942) was a Spanish musician and composer.

Career
Morera was born in Barcelona but moved with his father, a musician, to Buenos Aires, Argentina in 1867, studying organ, trumpet, and violin there. He returned in 1883 to Barcelona, studying with Isaac Albéniz and Felip Pedrell. Later he lived for two years in Brussels before returning to Argentina. He finally returned to Barcelona in 1890 where he was prominent in the movement Catalan Musical Modernism, with for example the opera La fada (The Fairy) in 1897. He founded the choir "Catalunya Nova". He wrote books on musical theory such as a "Practical Treatise on Harmony".

Among his students were Vicente Asencio, Agusti Grau, Manuel Infante, Xavier Montsalvatge and Carlos Surinach.

His music is generally strongly nationalist in character and forms part of the repertory of Catalan national compositions. He wrote more than 800 compositions, including songs, a requiem mass, lyric works, symphonic works, operas, symphonic poems, and sardanes for cobla.

Although he spent some time in Argentina and Belgium, Morera spent most of his life in Barcelona and died there in 1942.

The personal papers of Enric Morera are preserved in the Biblioteca de Catalunya.

Selected compositions
 Dansa del gnoms, 1893
 Introducció a l'Atlántida, symphonic poem, 1893
 Minuet per a quartet de corda, 1889
 Jesús de Nazareth, 1894
 La fada, opera, 1897
 L'alegria que passa, 1898
 Missa de rèquiem, 1899
 La nit de l'amor, 1901
 El comte Arnau, 1905
 Bruniselda, 1906
 Empòrium, opera, 1906
 Don Joan de Serrallonga, 1907
 La Santa Espina, patriotic song and sardana, 1907
 Cançons populars catalanes harmonitzades, 1910
 Titaina, opera, 1912
 Tassarba, opera, 1916
 Concert per a violoncel i orquestra (cello concerto), 1917
 El poema de la nit i el dia i de la terra i de l'amor, symphonic poem, 1920
 Cançons de career, 1926
 La marieta de l'ullviu, 1926
 La cançó dels Catalans, 1930
 El castell dels tres dragons,  1931
 Dotze cançons del Llibre de la Pàtria, 1936

See also
Conservatori Superior de Música del Liceu
Escola Municipal de Música
Sardana

References

Bibliography
 Aviñoa, Xosé: Morera (Barcelona: Nou Art Thor, 1985) (= Gent Nostra, vol. 37) 
 Morera, Enric: Moments viscuts (auto-biografia) (Barcelona: Gráficas Barcelona, 1936), 
 Pena, Joaquim: Enric Morera : assaig biogràfic (Barcelona: Institució del Teatre, 1937) (= Estudis Institut del Teatre, vol. 17) 
 Planes, Ramon: El mestre Morera i el seu món (Barcelona: Pòrtic, 1972) (= Llibre de butxaca, vol. 55), 
 Saperas, Miquel: El mestre Enric Morera (Andorra la Vella & Barcelona: Editorial Andorra, 1969) (= Collecció Ahir-Demà, vol. 4),

External links
Enric Morera i Viura: Biography and Works
Personal papers of Enric Morera in the Biblioteca de Catalunya
PDF scores and mp3 music

1865 births
1942 deaths
19th-century Spanish male musicians
20th-century classical composers
20th-century Spanish male musicians
20th-century Spanish musicians
Composers from Catalonia
Academic staff of the Conservatori Superior de Música del Liceu
Sardana
Spanish classical composers
Spanish male classical composers
Spanish Romantic composers